The 2016 Calcutta Football League Premier Division was the 118th season of the Calcutta Premier Division, a state league within the Indian state of West Bengal. The league is divided into two groups – Group A and Group B. The Championship title is awarded only to the Group A winner, while four teams from Group A are relegated to Group B at the end of the season and 4 teams from Group B are simultaneously promoted to Group A for the next season. The fixtures of Group A kicked off on 27 July 2016, while the fixtures for Group B had kicked off on 16 July 2016.

This will also be the first time in history that a trophy will be awarded to the Group A champions, on the day of the last match of the league. The Indian Football Association also took a decision to award the Amal Dutta award to the coach adjudged "Best coach of the league". The association also announced that a monetary award amounting to Rs. 25 lakhs will be given to the champions of Group A.

East Bengal were crowned champions for a record 38th time in history and for the 7th consecutive season. This is also the 3rd time that they have won the league without dropping a single point.

Premier Division A

Standings

Results 

; ; ;

1 East Bengal were awarded 3 points in the match against Mohun Bagan  as Mohun Bagan refused to field a team for the match citing inadequate time for practice. The result of the match was declared by IFA to be 3–0 in favour of East Bengal.

Statistics

Top Scorers 

Source: kolkatafootball.com
6 goals

  Daniel Bedemi (MOH)
  Darryl Duffy (MOH)

5 goals

  Joël Sunday (TOL)
  V.P.Suhair (USC)

4 goals

  Do Dong-Hyun (KEB)
  Manvir Singh (MSC)
  Zikahi Leonce Dedoz (MSC)
  Ghanefo Kromah (PRL)
  Ashim Biswas (SOU)
  M.Basant Singh (SOU)

3 goals

  Sanjay Rana (ARM)
  Jagannath Sana (BHA)
  Tirthankar Sarkar (BHA)
  Jiten Murmu (KEB)
  Lalrindika Ralte (KEB)
  Bayi Kamo (GTL)
  Prabir Das (MOH)
  Eric Brown (USC)

2 goals

  Anthony Chettri (ARM)
  Abhijit Sarkar (ARN)
  Bolane Kazeem Amobi (ARN)
  Pritam Sarkar (BHA)
  Arnab Mondal (KEB)
  Azharuddin Mallick (MOH)
  Thangjam Singh (MOH)
  Anil Kisku (PRL)
  Arghya Chakraborty (PRL)
  Syed Rahim Nabi (PRL)
  Monotosh Chakladar (USC)
  Shankar Oraon (USC)

1 goal

  Arjun Tudu (ARM)
  E.Alwyn (ARM)
  P.Jain (ARM)
  Samu Hembram (ARM)
  Goutam Thakur (ARN)
  Obasi Moses Louis (ARN)
  Orok Essien (BHA)
  Bijendra Rai (BHA)
  Francis Xavier (BHA)
  Adelaja (KEB)
  Calum Angus (KEB)
  Mohammed Rafique (KEB)
  Rahul Bheke (KEB)
  Subha Kumar (GTL)
  Rajib Shaw (GTL)
  Atinder Mani (MSC)
  Dipendu Dowary (MSC)
  Nitesh Chhikara (MSC)
  Parminder Singh (MSC)
  Usman Ashik (MSC)
  Ajay Singh (MOH)
  Sukhwinder Singh (PRL)
  Sumit Ghosh (PRL)
  Krishna Das Sharma (SOU)
  Suman Hazra (SOU)
  Alfred Jaryan (TOL)
  Kareem Omolaja (TOL)
  Palsang Lama (TOL)
  Reisangmei Vashum (TOL)
  Surabuddin Mollick (TOL)
  Bello Razaq (USC)
  Budhiram Tudu (USC)
  Md.Rashid (USC)

Hat-tricks 

4 The player scored 4 goals

Premier Division B

Standings 
Note: After the results of the 10th round, the teams were divided into two groups of top 6 and bottom 5. The top 6 teams are to play against each other in a single-leg format, called the championship round, while the bottom 5 teams play against each other in the same single-leg format called the relegation round. Each team carried forward their points and other records from the previous 10 matches into the championship or the relegation round.

Results 

; ; ;

References 

Calcutta Premier Division
Cal